Palmyra offensive may refer to:

Palmyra offensive (May 2015), a military operation launched during the Syrian Civil War by the Islamic State of Iraq and the Levant (ISIL)
Palmyra offensive (July–August 2015), an operation by the Syrian Arab Army to recapture the area lost in the previous offensive, ended with limited achievements
Palmyra offensive (March 2016), an operation by the Syrian Arab Army to recapture the city of Palmyra, which was previously lost to the Islamic State of Iraq and the Levant
Palmyra offensive (December 2016), a military operation launched during the Syrian Civil War by the Islamic State of Iraq and the Levant (ISIL)
Palmyra offensive (2017), a military operation launched by the Syrian Arab Army and its allies to recapture Palmyra from ISIL